Van de koele meren des doods is a 1982 Dutch film, directed by Nouchka van Brakel and based on the same-named novel by Frederik van Eeden. Book and film give an account of a bourgeois woman who struggles with her sexuality. The film is known internationally as Hedwig: The Quiet Lakes and The Cool Lakes of Death. The film was selected as the Dutch entry for the Best Foreign Language Film at the 55th Academy Awards, but was not accepted as a nominee.

Plot
The film begins in 1869. Hedwig is a girl from an upper-middle-class family. Since the death of her mother she is mainly interested in reading English books. During a visit to a cemetery she meets Johan, a young man whom she falls for immediately. She has sexual fantasies about him and is unable to hide this from her strictly religious family. Her governess tells her that she is sinning and she won't be able to get children anymore. Humiliated, she tries to commit suicide but fails.

Three years later Hedwig is a lady and meets Johan, now a poor aspiring artist. He wants to marry her but she thinks that she will make him unhappy, and instead marries a notary called Gerard. Their marriage is without passion: he has sworn chastity. Her resulting unhappiness soon manifests itself as sickness, and on the advice of her doctor the couple decide to have sex. It turns out to be a traumatic experience. She admits to her friend Leonora that she finds life too boring and predictable.

One day she gets a letter from Johan, who accuses her of being a prostitute. After a confrontation he shoots himself. Hedwig also tries to shoot herself but is stopped by Gerard. Soon after she meets Ritsaart, a romantic pianist with whom she begins an affair. When he wants her to go to bed with him she sends him away but at night she can't control her sexual fantasies.

During a passionate night with Ritsaart, Hedwig enjoys sex for the first time and intends to leave Gerard. He, filled with jealousy, plans to kill Ritsaart when he comes visiting, but their confrontation is interrupted when they note water running down the walls of the house: they run upstairs to find Hedwig in the bathroom with a slashed wrist. Gerard sees how Ritsaart turns out to be Hedwig's saving angel and lets his wife go. She moves with Ritsaart to Cobham, Kent, and impresses English society, and gives birth to a daughter, but the child dies after a few days.

Hedwig doesn't know how to separate reality and fantasy and impulsively goes to Calais, where she is fooled into going with a man whom she thinks is her husband but turns out to be a thief. On the train to Paris, he steals her bag, which she thinks contains her daughter. She ends up in an isolation cell of a psychiatric institution. After she is released she becomes addicted to morphine and prostitutes herself.

Hedwig faints from hunger on the street and is taken to a hospital. She gets help from the French convent sister Paula, who helps her overcome her addiction. When she is healthy again she returns to the Netherlands. She decides to visit Joop and runs into Ritsaart, telling him that she will always love him but doesn't want to see him again. She spends her last years with a farmer's family.

Production
The film was produced by Matthijs van Heijningen, with whom van Brakel had worked previously, most notably on Zwaarmoedige verhalen voor bij de centrale verwarming (1975). The budget was small—some E900,000 in today's currency—which led to conflict between Van Brakel and Van Heijningen. The former was concerned with artistic integrity, the latter with money; Van Heijningen publicly criticized the director and her staff (he called them lazy amateurs in a leading Dutch movie magazine), leading to a work stoppage. Van Heijningen apologized, again publicly, and work was resumed; afterward, he took out a full-page ad and congratulated the crew—they did likewise.

Several scenes in the film were shot at the Hof van Moerkerken in Mijnsheerenland where Frederik van Eeden lived in the 19th century.

Cast
Renée Soutendijk as Hedwig Marga 'Hetty' de Fontayne
Derek de Lint as Ritsaart (Richard Delmonte)
Adriaan Olree as Gerard Johannes Hendrikus Wijbrands
Erik van 't Wout as Johan
Peter Faber as Joop
Claire Wauthion as Sister Paula / Mother
Krijn ter Braak as Father
Lettie Oosthoek as Governess
Kristine de Both as Leonora
Huub Stapel as Herman
Siem Vroom as Religion teacher
Rudolf Lucieer as General practitioner

Note: Dutch actor Hans van Tongeren was initially cast as Johan, the character who commits suicide—but he committed suicide just before the filming started.

Reception
The film is praised as a "handsome period melodrama". Critical reviews were positive, and with 602,637 admissions it was the best-attended Dutch movie of 1982. The Dutch broadcaster VARA listed the film at #10 in a list of the best Dutch films of the twentieth century, and the movie site NeerlandsFilmdoek.nl listed it as #56 out of 258.

See also
 List of submissions to the 55th Academy Awards for Best Foreign Language Film
 List of Dutch submissions for the Academy Award for Best Foreign Language Film

References

External links
 

1982 films
1980s Dutch-language films
Dutch drama films
Films set in the 19th century
Films based on Dutch novels
Netherlands in fiction
Films set in the Netherlands
Films about suicide
Films directed by Nouchka van Brakel